In cryptography, a Key Checksum Value (KCV) is the checksum of a cryptographic key. It is used to validate the key integrity or compare keys without knowing their actual values. The KCV is computed by encrypting a block of bytes, each with value '00' or '01', with the cryptographic key and retaining the first 6 hexadecimal characters of the encrypted result. It is used in key management in different ciphering devices, like SIM-cards or Hardware Security Modules (HSM).

In the GlobalPlatform technical specifications the KCV is defined for DES/3DES and AES keys as follows:

The same definition is used by the GSMA.

References 

Key management